Charles Mason (April 172825 October 1786) was an English astronomer who made significant contributions to 18th-century science and American history, particularly through his survey with Jeremiah Dixon of the Mason–Dixon line, which came to mark the border between Maryland and Pennsylvania (1764–1768). The border between Delaware and Maryland is also defined by a part of the Mason–Dixon line.

Early career
Mason's early career was spent at the Royal Greenwich Observatory near London.  He served as assistant astronomer from 1756 to 1760 under the Reverend James Bradley, the third  Astronomer Royal.

While employed at the Greenwich Observatory, Mason became familiar with Professor Tobias Mayer's Tables of the Moon.  The Lunar Tables were designed to solve the problem of determining longitude at sea, a challenge that frustrated scientists and navigators for decades.  Mason worked throughout his life to perfect the Lunar Tables as a method of improving navigation at sea.  In 1787, Mason's work was recognized, and he was awarded £750 (not the full prize of £10,000 to £20,000) by the Board of Longitude for his work on perfecting the Tables.

1761 transit of Venus

In 1761, Mason was assigned to travel to the island of Sumatra to observe the transit of Venus as part of an international effort to record data that would enable scientists to determine the distance from the Earth to the Sun.  Mason was joined by Jeremiah Dixon, a surveyor and amateur astronomer from Cockfield in the County of Durham.  Owing to an attack by a French man-of-war, they did not reach their destination in time for the transit and were forced to record their observations from the Cape of Good Hope. On the way back from the Cape they visited St Helena where they made a series of observations with the astronomer Nevil Maskelyne.

The Mason–Dixon line survey

From November 1763 to 1768, Mason and Jeremiah Dixon established the boundary line between the American provinces of Pennsylvania and Maryland. Colonial surveyors had been unable accurately to establish the boundary due to their poor training and inadequate scientific instruments.  Mason and Dixon, accompanied by a large party of assistants, established three important boundaries: (1) the south boundary line of Pennsylvania separating it from Maryland and Virginia; (2) the west boundary of the three lower counties of Pennsylvania (now Delaware) separating it from Maryland; and (3) the south boundary of the three lower counties.  The pair also conducted a number of experiments for the Royal Society such as measuring a degree of longitude.  Mason's journal provides the most complete record of the survey and its progress. The journal includes his astronomical observations and personal notes about the American frontier environment and his experiences in colonial America.

Mason and Dixon failed to measure the entire length of the south boundary of Pennsylvania as determined by its charter.  In the summer of 1767, the surveying party crossed the Monongahela River and the Great Catawba War Path, violating a treaty limiting the westward expansion of English settlements.  Not wishing to risk inciting native hostilities, Mason and Dixon were forced to return east after making their final observations at the crest of Brown's Hill.

Career after the Mason–Dixon line survey
After completing the boundary survey in the United States, Mason returned to Greenwich where he continued work on Mayer's Lunar Tables.  He also contributed to the Nautical Almanac, working under Nevil Maskelyne, the fifth Astronomer Royal.

On 27 September 1786, Mason wrote to Benjamin Franklin, whom he knew from his election to the American Philosophical Society in 1767 where Franklin was a founding member, informing him that he had returned to Philadelphia with his wife, seven sons, and one daughter.  Mason was very ill and confined to his bed.  Mason also shared with Franklin the design for an astronomical project.  Mason provided no explanation for his return to the United States, and nothing more is known of Mason's proposed project.

Mason died on 25 October 1786, in Philadelphia. He was buried there in Christ Church Burial Ground.

Posthumous recognition
The crater Mason on the Moon is named after him.

Mason is one of the title characters of Thomas Pynchon's 1997 novel Mason & Dixon. The song "Sailing to Philadelphia", inspired by Pynchon's book, appears on Mark Knopfler's album of the same name; on the original version, Knopfler sings the role of Dixon and James Taylor that of Mason.

Surveying organizations dedicated a memorial at his previously unmarked grave on 31 August 2013, using a Mason–Dixon line stone that was found displaced from its position.

Notes

External links
 Mason and Dixon Line Preservation Partnership—Information about Charles Mason and the Mason and Dixon Line]
 Journal of Mason and Dixon (PDF)
 Mason's logbook for his 1761–2 voyage to observe the Transit of Venus. Digitized at the University of Pennsylvania
 Mason's biography from the American National Biography
 Account of Mason's Observations of the Transit of Venus in 1769 (PDF)

18th-century British astronomers
English surveyors
1728 births
1786 deaths
Burials at Christ Church, Philadelphia
People of colonial Pennsylvania